First String Teenage High: The Songs of Tullycraft Played By People Who Aren't is a tribute album to the seminal twee band Tullycraft. The compilation features cover versions of Tullycraft songs performed by 24 indie artists. The album was originally released on AAJ/BumbleBear Records in 2003. In 2009 Unchikun Records re-released the album digitally. A second tribute album titled Wish I'd Kept A Scrapbook: A Tribute to Tullycraft was released on Unchikun Records in 2010.

Track listing

Personnel 
 arranged by Jimmy Hughes
 mastered by Chris Bracco

See also
Tullycraft

External links
Unchikun Records
Tullycraft

2003 compilation albums
Tribute albums